Christophe Kenner (December 25, 1929 – January 25, 1976) was an American, New Orleans-based R&B singer and songwriter, best known for two hit singles in the early 1960s, "I Like It Like That" and "Land of 1000 Dances", which became staples in the repertoires of many other musicians.

Biography
Born in the farming community of Kenner, Louisiana, upriver from New Orleans, Kenner sang gospel music with his church choir. He moved to New Orleans when he was in his teens, to work as a stevedore.

In 1955 he made his first recordings, for a small label, Baton Records, without success. In 1957, he recorded his "Sick and Tired" for Imperial Records. Kenner's recording reached No. 13 on the Billboard R&B chart. Fats Domino covered it the next year, and his version became a hit on the pop chart. "Rocket to the Moon" and "Life Is Just a Struggle", both cut for Ron Records, were other notable songs Kenner recorded in this period.

Moving to another New Orleans label, Instant (which was initially called 'Valiant' before they discovered the name was already in use), he began to work with the pianist and arranger Allen Toussaint. In 1961, this collaboration produced "I Like It Like That", his biggest and first pop hit, peaking at No. 2 on the Billboard Hot 100 chart (covered in 1965 by the Dave Clark Five), and "Something You Got" (covered by Wilson Pickett, Alvin Robinson, the Ramsey Lewis Trio, Johnny Rivers, Chuck Jackson, Earl Grant, Maxine Brown, Fats Domino, Bobby Womack, the Moody Blues, the Searchers, the American Breed, Fairport Convention, Bruce Springsteen, Them, and Jimi Hendrix). "I Like It Like That" sold over one million copies, was nominated for a Grammy Award, and was awarded a gold disc by the Recording Industry Association of America.

Kenner's song "Something You Got" later became a hit for Alvin Robinson, the Ramsey Lewis Trio and the duo of Chuck Jackson and Maxine Brown. In 1963 he released his most enduring song, "Land of 1000 Dances", based on an old spiritual.  Kenner's version reached No. 77 on the pop chart in 1963. It was later covered by various artists, including Cannibal & the Headhunters, Fats Domino, Thee Midniters, Wilson Pickett, the Action, and Patti Smith. Kenner continued to record for Instant and for other small local labels, including many of his lesser-known songs from the 1960s, such as "My Wife", "Packing Up" and "They Took My Money". He released an album, Land of 1000 Dances, on Atlantic Records in 1966; it was reissued on CD by Collectors' Choice in 2007.

Kenner's career was affected by his unpredictable behavior – he drank and spent heavily, and would sometimes miss shows or forget the words to his songs. He continued to record until 1968, with diminishing success. In 1968, Kenner was convicted of statutory rape of a minor and spent three years in Louisiana's Angola prison.

Kenner died from a heart attack in 1976, at the age of 46, triggered by alcoholism.

Chart singles

References

External links
Land of 1000 Dances

1929 births
1976 deaths
20th-century African-American male singers
People from Kenner, Louisiana
American rhythm and blues singers
Rhythm and blues musicians from New Orleans
Songwriters from Louisiana
Singers from Louisiana
Atlantic Records artists
People convicted of statutory rape offenses
Alcohol-related deaths in Louisiana
African-American male songwriters